Fellow Travelers is an opera in 16 scenes composed by Gregory Spears to a libretto by Greg Pierce, based on Thomas Mallon's 2007 novel Fellow Travelers. A co-commission by Cincinnati Opera and G. Sterling Zinsmeyer, the opera was developed by Opera Fusion: New Works, a collaboration between Cincinnati Opera and the University of Cincinnati College-Conservatory of Music which focuses on the creation of new American operas. Fellow Travelers premiered at Cincinnati Opera in June 2016 and was presented by the Lyric Opera of Chicago in March 2018, the Minnesota Opera in June 2018, and Boston Lyric Opera in November 2019.

Roles

Synopsis
The opera is set during the McCarthy era of the 1950s and focuses on the "lavender scare", a witch hunt and mass firings of gay people from the United States government. The story centers on the love affair between two men working for the federal government—Hawkins "Hawk" Fuller, a State Department official, and Timothy Laughlin, a recent college graduate working in a senator's office.

Scenes

 Park in DuPont Circle. Tim is sitting on a park bench writing in a notepad. A stranger, Hawk, starts a conversation with him, learning that Tim is an intern reporter, Hawk impresses him with insider's knowledge of D.C. politics. Hawk makes gentle fun of Tim's drinking milk, but gives his shoulder an affectionate squeeze when he leaves.
 Potter's Office. Hawk has recommended Tim to Senator Potter. Tim submits a sample of his writing and is hired.
 Hawk's Office. Tim is seen buying a book, inscribing it and crossing to Hawk's office where Mary and Miss Lightfoot are gossiping. The book is a thank-you gift for Hawk's recommending him. Mary knows that Hawk “has snagged another one," i.e. another young man whom he hopes to involve in a homosexual relationship.
 Tim's Apartment. Hawk drops in as Tim is cooking dinner. Hawk kisses him and together they dream of lying "under the sheets" in Bermuda as partners.
 St. Peter's Cathedral. Tim, alone, meditates on the sin he has committed with Hawk.
 Christmas Party at the Hotel Washington. Mary understands the gay relationship while Miss Lightfoot is puzzled by Hawk’s calling Tim "an Irish Tiger Cub."
 Interrogation Room M304. Hawk is given several absurd tests that the Interrogator believes might reveal homosexuality— walking to a wall to detect hip swaying, direct questioning, reading a passage with a lot of "s’s" to detect sibilants. Finally he is allowed to go after skillfully passing a lie detector test.
 Tim's Apartment. Tim tries to get Hawk interested in a weekend together or at least a date. Hawk reveals that he was called in for questioning because Miss Lightfoot betrayed him by reporting his homosexuality. He knows it was Miss Lightfoot because she quit when he got the summons.Intermission
 McCarthy Meeting. McCarthy is told that his "special friendship" with Roy Cohn is known to the press, so he will have to be fired. Tim walks away from this conversation, apparently disgusted. 
 Mary's Kitchen. Mary tries to warn Tim about Hawk. Hawk enters and tells Tim that he wants to celebrate by bringing another boy into their relationship. Tim yells at him to get out. Hawk leaves with the attitude of not caring but afterwards is seen in agony.
 Roof of the Old Post Office. Hawk is unhinged. Tim is disheveled. Tim has decided that the only way to get over his obsession with Hawk is to enlist in the army.
 Hawk's Office. Mary gives Hawk her letter of resignation. She cannot work for Hawk, who is a notorious seducer of boys but who has enough clout to avoid the firings that his friends are being subjected to. She also blames him for breaking Tim's heart.
 Tim in France / Hawk in Foggy Bottom. Hawk and Tim exchange letters. Tim as a reporter for the Army newspaper has become interested in European politics, especially in the plight of the Hungarian refugees. Hawk, now  married (to a woman) and a homeowner, says it is time for both of them to grow up.
 Brick House.  Hawk and Tim, now older and more mature, converse in a conventional brick house that Hawk is renting for them as a love nest. Hawk tells Tim that he is married. He betrays his knowledge of Tim's being fired and asks if he can do Tim a favor, presumably as a kind of recompense. Tim asks if he can get him put in charge of the Hungarian Refugee Relief effort. Tim reveals that he goes to confession. At this point a mini-scene is inserted between the priest and Tim in which Tim tells the disappointed priest that he cannot give up Hawk. Tim leaves the house out of anger and jealousy after Hawk describes his contentment in being married and insists that they cannot have a domestic and constant relationship. 
 Mary's Kitchen. Mary, fed up with Washington, is packing to move back to New Orleans. Hawk asks her to tell Tim that he was the one who outed him so that Tim will hate him and thus be relieved from his obsession.  Mary, disgusted, calls Hawk a swine. She goes to Tim and explains why he didn't get the job he was qualified for, telling him that Hawk wasn't the man Tim wanted him to be.
 Park in DuPont Circle. Hawk comes to the same park bench seen in Scene 1 to bid Tim a final farewell. Tim says he is going back to New York to live with his sister and be “Uncle Tim” to her kids. He says he has tried to hate Hawk, but cannot.

Music and instrumentation 
The opera is scored for a 17-person chamber orchestra. According to the Opera News critic, the score uses minimalist soundscapes combined at times with a "neo-Puccinian lyricism".

References

See also 
 Fellow Travelers (miniseries)
 Harvey Milk (opera)
 Patience and Sarah (opera)

Operas
English-language operas
2016 operas
LGBT-related operas
Operas based on novels
Operas set in the 20th century
Operas set in the United States
Operas about politicians
Cultural depictions of Joseph McCarthy